Cooperton is a town in Kiowa County, Oklahoma, United States. The population was 16 at the 2010 census, a decline of 20 percent from the total of 20 in 2000.

History
This community, originally called Cooper, was planned in 1899 by Frank Cooper, who had organized a settlement company in anticipation of the opening of the Kiowa, Comanche and Apache Reservation in August 1901. Learning that the land would be granted by lottery instead of a run, Cooper requested and was granted 320 acres for members of his company. The name had to be changed to Cooperton, because there was already another community named Cooper in the territory.

Cooperton had one hundred residents by 1910, and reached its peak population of 187 by 1940. Thereafter, the population declined, reaching  20 by the start of the 21st Century.

Geography
Cooperton is located at  (34.866001, -98.870026).

Demographics

As of the census of 2000, there were 20 people, 12 households, and 6 families residing in the town. There were 19 housing units at an average density of 38.8 per square mile (15.0/km2). The racial makeup of the town was 85.00% White and 15.00% African American.

There were 12 households, out of which 16.7% had children under the age of 18 living with them, 41.7% were married couples living together, and 50.0% were non-families. 50.0% of all households were made up of individuals, and 33.3% had someone living alone who was 65 years of age or older. The average household size was 1.67 and the average family size was 2.33.

In the town, the population was spread out, with 15.0% under the age of 18, 20.0% from 25 to 44, 20.0% from 45 to 64, and 45.0% who were 65 years of age or older. The median age was 64 years. For every 100 females, there were 300.0 males. For every 100 females age 18 and over, there were 240.0 males.

The median income for a household in the town was $13,125, and the median income for a family was $14,375. Males had a median income of $11,875 versus $0 for females. The per capita income for the town was $12,096. There are 28.6% of families living below the poverty line and 35.7% of the population, including 60.0% of under eighteens and 22.2% of those over 64.

References

External links
 Cooperton at GhostTowns.com
 Encyclopedia of Oklahoma History and Culture - Cooperton
 Oklahoma Digital Maps: Digital Collections of Oklahoma and Indian Territory

Towns in Kiowa County, Oklahoma
Towns in Oklahoma